Fatih Solak (born July 25, 1980) is a Turkish professional basketball player. He stands 2.13 m tall making him a Center. He also has a very impressive physique and weighs 125 kg.

Pro career
In the past, he has also played for Ülkerspor and Beşiktaş Istanbul again of the Turkish league.

Solak has always identified his ambition as playing in the NBA, in which other Turkish National players Mehmet Okur, Ersan İlyasova  and Hidayet Türkoğlu are currently playing. Fatih Solak only started playing basketball at the age of seventeen, in which he had a height of 6 feet 3 (1.90 metres). Ever since his first year in basketball, Fatih Solak has developed vastly and has become an established figure for the Turkish National team. Due to his success in blocking, rebounds and 2.08 figure, Solak has been likened to Houston Rockets legend Dikembe Mutombo. Fatih is proud of being likened to one of his NBA idols and aims to continue producing the performances that has made him this popular with Turkish fans. Solak's average stats for the 2006–2007 season is as follows: 7.75 points, 6.5 rebounds, 4.1 blocks per game; which is deemed to be successful by his coach at Galatasaray Cafe Crown Murat Özyer.

Fatih Solak has always thanked former coach Selcuk Ernak who is believed to have helped in Fatih's development as one of Turkey's top centres. Selçuk Ernak is the current coach at Banvitspor. Murat Özyer, his coach at Galatasaray Café Crown, has also received a mention from Fatih for consistently giving him enough minutes on the field. In June 2008, Fatih Solak transferred to Aliağa Petkim.

For the 2010–11 season he signed with Türk Telekom B.K.

Turkish national team
Fatih Solak was part of the Turkish national team that achieved sixth spot in the 2006 FIBA World Championship in Japan. He is best known for his amazing blocks and rebounds, and also contributes to the attack. Fatih Solak has been recently known for his close friendship with fellow National Team Player Ermal Kurtoğlu.

Solak most recently (2008 September) represented Turkey in the Division A Eurobasket Qualification tournament. Turkey won all her 6 games, against France, Belgium and Ukraine. Fatih Solak impressed especially in the last game of the group matches against France. Turkey won in France 80 to 78 and Fatih Solak recorded in this game 16 points, 6 rebounds and 4 blocks. If he continues to play at this level he can be a dominant force for Turkey at the 2009 European Championship that Turkey has qualified for as the leader of its group of four.

References

External links
 Player profile at www.TBLStat.net

1980 births
Living people
Aliağa Petkim basketball players
Beşiktaş men's basketball players
Galatasaray S.K. (men's basketball) players
Kepez Belediyesi S.K. players
People from Kayseri
Turkish men's basketball players
Türk Telekom B.K. players
Ülker G.S.K. basketball players
Mediterranean Games bronze medalists for Turkey
Competitors at the 2009 Mediterranean Games
2006 FIBA World Championship players
Mediterranean Games medalists in basketball
Centers (basketball)